Hendrik "Henk" Elzerman (born 18 September 1958) is a former freestyle swimmer from the Netherlands, who competed for his native country at the 1976 Summer Olympics in Montreal, Quebec, Canada. There he was eliminated in the qualifying heats of the 400 m and 1500 m freestyle. As a member of the Dutch Relay Team, he finished in sixth position (7:42.56) of the 4 × 200 m freestyle. Both his elder sister Josien and brother Hans were international competitive swimmers, who represented the Netherlands at the 1972 Summer Olympics.

Between 1975 and 1977 he set more than 20 national records in the 200–1500 m freestyle events.

References

1958 births
Living people
Dutch male freestyle swimmers
Olympic swimmers of the Netherlands
Swimmers from The Hague
Swimmers at the 1976 Summer Olympics